Low Street railway station was on the Tilbury loop line segment of the London, Tilbury and Southend line, at a level crossing near the villages of West Tilbury and East Tilbury, Essex.

It was opened in 1861 and closed on 5 June 1967. Low Street was not on the 1963 list of passenger stations to be closed under the Beeching cuts.

A through goods loop was located on the down line to the north of the station, this closed on 29 September 1964. There were also sidings associated with gravel workings south and east of the station.

References

Transport in Thurrock
Disused railway stations in Essex
Former London, Tilbury and Southend Railway stations
Railway stations in Great Britain opened in 1861
Railway stations in Great Britain closed in 1967
1861 establishments in England